Serine/threonine-protein kinase MAK is an enzyme that in humans is encoded by the MAK gene.

The product of this gene is a serine/threonine protein kinase related to kinases involved in cell cycle regulation. It is expressed almost exclusively in the testis, primarily in germ cells. Studies of the mouse and rat homologs have localized the kinase to the chromosomes during meiosis in spermatogenesis, specifically to the synaptonemal complex that exists while homologous chromosomes are paired. There is, however, a study of the mouse homolog that has identified high levels of expression in developing sensory epithelia so its function may be more generalized.

References

Further reading